Busan, officially known as  is South Korea's second most populous city after Seoul, with a population of over 3.4 million inhabitants. Formerly romanized as Pusan, it is the economic, cultural and educational center of southeastern South Korea, with its port being Korea's busiest and the sixth-busiest in the world. The surrounding "Southeastern Maritime Industrial Region" (including Ulsan, South Gyeongsang, Daegu, and some of North Gyeongsang and South Jeolla) is South Korea's largest industrial area. The large volumes of port traffic and urban population in excess of 1 million make Busan a Large-Port metropolis using the Southampton System of Port-City classification.

Busan is divided into 15 major administrative districts and a single county, together housing a population of approximately 3.6 million. The full metropolitan area, the Southeastern Maritime Industrial Region, has a population of approximately 8 million. The most densely built-up areas of the city are situated in a number of narrow valleys between the Nakdong and the Suyeong Rivers, with mountains separating most of the districts. The Nakdong is Korea's longest river and Busan's Haeundae Beach is also the country's largest.

Busan is a center for international conventions, hosting a APEC summit in 2005. It is also a center for sports tournaments in Korea, having hosted the 2002 Asian Games and FIFA World Cup. It is home to the world's largest department store, the Shinsegae Centum City. Busan was added to the UNESCO Creative Cities Network as a "City of Film" in December 2014.

Names
The name "Busan" is the Revised Romanization of the city's Korean name since the late 15th century. It officially replaced the earlier McCune-Reischauer romanization Pusan in 2000. During the Japanese period it was spelled "Fuzan".

The name  (now written  using the Korean alphabet) is Sino-Korean for "Cauldron Mountain", believed to be a former name of Mt Hwangryeong   Hwangryeong-san) west of the city center. The area's ancient state MtGeochil (Geochilsan-guk, "Rough-Mountain Land") is similarly thought to refer to the same mountain, which towers over the town's harbor on the Suyeong. (The later Silla district of Geochilsan-gun was renamed Dongnae in 757.)

History

MtGeochil (Geochilsan-guk) is recorded as a chiefdom of the Jinhan Confederacy in the 2nd–4th centuries. It was absorbed by Silla and organized as a district (gun). The grave goods excavated from mounded burials at Bokcheon-dong indicate that a complex chiefdom ruled by powerful individuals was present in the Busan area in the 4th century, just as Korea's Three Kingdoms were forming. The mounded burials of Bokcheon-dong were built along the top of a ridge that overlooks a wide area that makes up parts of modern-day Dongnae-gu and Yeonje-gu. Archaeologists excavated more than 250 iron weapons and ingots from Burial No. 38, a wooden chamber tomb at Bokcheon-dong. 

From the beginning of the 15th century, the Korean government designated Busan as a trading port with the Japanese and allowed their settlement. Other Japanese settlements in Ulsan and Jinhae diminished later, but the Busan settlement continued until Japan invaded Korea in 1592. After the war, diplomatic relations with the new shogunate in Japan were established in 1607, and Busan was permitted to be reconstructed. The Japanese settlement, waegwan, though relocated into Choryang later, continued to exist until Korea was exposed to modern diplomacy in 1876. In 1876, Busan became the first international port in Korea under the terms of the Treaty of Ganghwa.

During the Japanese rule, Busan developed into a hub trading port with Japan. Busan was the only city in Korea to adopt the steam tramway before electrification was introduced in 1924.

During the Korean War, Busan was one of only two cities in South Korea not captured by the North Korean army within the first three months of the war, the other being Daegu. As a result, the cities became refugee camp sites for Koreans during the war. According to the Korea Times, around 500,000 refugees were located in Busan in early 1951.

As Busan was one of the few areas in Korea that remained under the control of South Korea throughout the Korean War, for some time it served as a de facto  capital of the Republic of Korea. UN troops established a defensive perimeter around the city known as the Pusan Perimeter in the summer and fall of 1950. Since then, the city has been a self-governing metropolis and has built a strong urban character. 

In 1963, Busan separated from Gyeongsangnam-do to become a Directly Governed City (직할시). In 1983, the provincial capital of Gyeongsangnam-do was moved from Busan to Changwon.

Geography
Busan is located on the southeastern tip of the Korean Peninsula. It is located on the coast, which determined the development of the whole city itself. Busan borders low mountains on the north and west, and the seas on the south and east. The Nakdong River Delta is located on the west side of the city, and Geumjeongsan, the highest mountain in the city, is on the north. The Nakdong River, South Korea's longest river, flows through the west and empties into the Korea Strait. The southeastern region, called Yeongnam in Korea, encompasses both Gyeongsang Provinces and 3 metropolitan cities of Busan, Daegu and Ulsan. Ulsan lies northeast of Busan. The combined population exceeds 13 million.

The closest overseas area to Busan is Tsushima, Japan, with a distance of about 49.5 km. The closest Japanese mainland area to Busan is Fukuoka, and the distance from Busan to Fukuoka is about 180 km (112 miles). Busan and Fukuoka are sister cities.

Climate

Located on the southeasternmost tip of the Korean Peninsula, Busan has a cooler version of a humid subtropical climate (Köppen: Cfa/Cwa). Extremely high or low temperatures are rare. May to July, late Springs and early Summers, are usually cooler than inland regions because of the ocean effect. Late Summer, and early Fall, August, and September, are generally hot and humid and the city may experience typhoons at that time and be generally rainy. On September 15, 1959, Super Typhoon Sarah passed by the coast of the city and caused catastrophic damage. An unusually severe storm on September 12, 2003, Typhoon Maemi, also caused damage to ships and buildings and resulted in over 48 fatalities. Typhoon Hinnamnor on September 6, 2022, caused destruction in Busan as a category 2, producing high waves, destructive winds, and flooding. Busan is the most prone city in South Korea to typhoons and other natural disasters.

October and November are generally the most comfortable, with clear skies and pleasant temperatures. Winters are cool and comparatively dry with high winds, but much milder than other parts of Korea, except Jeju-do and several islands off the southern coast. Busan and the nearby area have the least snow compared to other regions of Korea due to its location. Snow falls on an average of only about 4 days per year.

Administrative divisions
In 1957, Busan adopted a division system with the creation of six gu (districts): Busanjin-gu, Dong-gu, Dongnae-gu, Jung-gu, Seo-gu, and Yeongdo-gu. Today, Busan has divided into fifteen gu and one gun (county).

Economy 

Busan is the 2nd largest city in Korea, a maritime logistics hub in Northeast Asia with its world-class mega ports, and a gateway to the Eurasian continent. In 2017, the maritime city recorded a GRDP of US$758.4 billion with a per capita GRDP of US$22,000. The city's economy is made up of the service industry (70.3%), manufacturing (19.8%), construction (5.9%), agriculture & fisheries (0.8%), and other sectors (3.2%).

As the 6th largest port in the world, the port of Busan processed 21.81 million TEU of container cargo volume in 2020. The port's container terminal has 43 berths - 20 berths at the North Port, and 23 berths at the Busan New Port (including 2 multi-purpose berths). The port is part of the 21st Century Maritime Silk Road that runs from the Chinese coast to Singapore, towards the southern tip of India to Mombasa, from there through the Red Sea via the Suez Canal to the Mediterranean, there to the Upper Adriatic region to the northern Italian hub of Trieste with its connections to Central Europe and the North Sea.

Moreover, the city is a center of marine science and R&D, and home to a number of relevant institutions, such as the Korea Maritime Institute (KMI), the Korea Institute of Ocean Science and Technology (KIOST), the National Fishery Products Quality Management Service, the Korea Hydrographic and Oceanographic Agency (KHOA), and the Korea National Maritime Museum, located in Dongsam Innovation Complex in Yeongdo-gu district. Moreover, the International Federation of Freight Forwarders Associations (FIATA) World Congress is scheduled to be hosted in Busan in 2020. (Busan New Port)

The city is also known for its global MICE (Meetings, Incentives, Conferences, and Exhibitions) industry. The city's convention and exhibition zone have excellent conditions and infrastructure to host large-scale international events, which includes BEXCO in Centum City, Nurimaru APEC House, and hotels nearby natural environments. Major international conferences in Busan include the 2005 APEC Economic Leaders' Meeting, ASEAN–Republic of Korea Commemorative Summit 2014, and 2018 African Development Bank Group Annual Meetings. (BEXCO)

Busan is also a center of finance. Korea Exchange (KRX), Korea's sole securities exchange operator, is headquartered in Busan. The city is home to a number of financial institutions, such as the Korea Technology Finance Corporation, Korea Asset Management Corporation, Korea Housing-Finance Corporation, Korea Housing & Urban Guarantee Corporation, Korea Securities Depository, Korea Maritime Guarantee Insurance, Maritime Finance Center, The Korea Shipping and Maritime Transportation Co., Ltd, Korea Asset Management Corporation, and BNK Financial Group. 

Commercial areas are dispersed throughout the city near busy intersections and adjacent to university campuses, but the two largest central business districts in Busan are Seomyeon and Gwangbok-dong/Nampo-dong. There are also four substantial shopping areas of note: Seomyeon, Gwangbok-dong, Busan Daehak-ga in Jangjeon-dong, and Centum City in Haeundae-gu.

Seomyeon Station is one of the busiest subway stations in Korea; it is the transfer station between Busan Subway Line 1 and Line 2. Seomyeon subway station is also home to a large number of underground stores, selling a variety of products, predominately clothing, and footwear. These are small stores selling locally produced products. The local head offices of Korean and international banks are located in Seomyeon. It is recognized as the ascendant shopping and entertainment district. It is also home to "Seomyeon Medical Street", the district encompassing the 1 km-radius range around Lotte Department Store in Seomyeon and the Buam subway station. The Street is home to a total of 160 cosmetic and other medical clinics, including those specializing in cosmetic surgery, dermatology, ophthalmology and dentistry. Directly adjacent to Seomyeon is Bujeon Market, the largest traditional market in the city.

The Gwangbok-dong, Nampo-dong, and Jungang-dong areas form the old central business district. Some of the restaurants in this district use family recipes passed down through the generations. Jagalchi Market, a large seafood market, is located in this area. The Gukje Market is also nearby. Jungang-dong is the home of many international law offices, the old Immigration Office, and the international ferry terminal serving Japanese routes. Lotte World II is currently under construction along the water between Jungang-dong 7-Ga and 8-Ga.

Centum City, an industrial complex, contains luxury department stores. Busan has many major department stores, including Lotte Department Store (located in Seomyeon, Centum City, Gwangbok-dong and Dongnae), Lotte Premium Outlet (in Gimhae and Gijang), Shinsegae Premium Outlet (in Gijang), as well as large supermarket chains across the city, such as Homeplus, e-mart, and Costco.

Busan's major hotels include The Westin Chosun Busan, Paradise Busan, and Park Hyatt Busan. In 2017,  Ananti Hilton Busan opened in the Gijang-eup district.

Education

Universities with graduate schools

Busan University of Foreign Studies (BUFS)
Busan Presbyterian University
Busan National University of Education (BNUE)
Catholic University of Pusan
Dongseo University
Dong-A University
Dong-eui University
Friedrich-Alexander University Busan Campus (German University in Korea)
Inje University – Busan Campus
Kosin University
Korea Maritime and Ocean University
Kyungsung University
Pukyong National University (PKNU)
Pusan National University (PNU)
Silla University
Tongmyong University
Youngsan University

Other institutes of higher education
Busan Arts College
Busan Institute of Science and Technology (BIST)
Busan Kyungsang College
Busan Polytechnic College
Daedong College
Dong-Pusan College
Dongju College
Korea Institute of Maritime and Fisheries Technology

Foreign schools
Primary and secondary schools:
Busan Foreign Language High School (부산외국어고등학교)
Busan Foreign School (Pre-Kindergarten through 12th Grade)

International School of Busan ( Pre-Kindergarten through 12th Grade)
Overseas Chinese Elementary School Busan
Overseas Chinese High School, Busan

High schools
Keumjeong High School (1986)

Culture and attractions

Busan not only features a variety of antique and souvenir shops, but also unique restaurants, attractions, and accommodations.

Parks, beaches, and highlights

Nampo-dong is a central shopping and café district. The area around Pukyong National University and Kyungsung University also has many cafés, bars, and restaurants attracting college students and youth.

Busan is called the summer capital of Korea since it attracts tourists from all over the country to its six beaches. Luxury hotels and a carnival boardwalk line the beach at Haeundae. Gwangalli Beach has cafés, bars, and restaurants along the beach, and the Grand Gwangan Bridge. Other beaches include Dadaepo Beach on the west edge of the city and Songdo Beach, which is south-central.

Haeundae Beach is one of the most famous beaches in Korea. The 2009 film Tidal Wave (2009) is about a tsunami hitting Busan at this beach.

Geumjeongsan to the west is a weekend hiking spot for Busan residents. To the north, the neighborhoods around Pusan National University (also known as PNU, which is one of the most highly recognized national institutes of higher education in Korea) have student theaters, cafés, bars, and restaurants, as well as open-air cultural street performances on weekend nights. Nearby is Beomeosa, the city's main Korean Buddhist temple.

Yongdusan Park occupies 69,000 square meters/ and is home to the Busan Tower, Yongdusan Art Gallery, and the Busan Aquarium, the largest aquarium in South Korea. The park supports approximately seventy different species of trees and is a tourist destination, with various cultural events throughout the year.

Dongnae-gu is a wealthy and traditional residential area. Dongnae Oncheon is a natural spa area with many baths, tourist hotels, restaurants, clubs, and shopping areas. Many restaurants in the area use family recipes. Chungnyeolsa is a Confucian shrine for soldiers who died during the 16th-century battle against the Japanese at Dongnae Fortress.

Taejongdae is a natural park with cliffs facing the open sea on the island of Yeongdo.

The area known as the "Foreigners' Shopping Street", but commonly referred to as "Texas Street" near part of the Port of Busan, and adjacent to the front entrance to the Busan Train Station (부산역) has many businesses that cater to the local Russian population, as well as the crews of foreign ships. The area was originally the location of the local Chinatown and still contains a Chinese school.

Haedong Yonggung temple is one of three sacred places related to the Goddess Buddha. It is located right near the sea. It lies on a mountain in the front and the sea at the back.

Gamcheon Cultural Village was created in the 1950s as a residential community along a mountain slope. The houses in the village are built in a staircase fashion. The village often dubbed the "Machu Picchu of Korea" attracts many tourists. In addition, the village received a special mention during the 3rd edition of the international award ceremony, "UCLG-MEXICO CITY-Culture 21".
Busan Citizens Park (formerly Camp Hialeah) is a former Imperial Japanese Army base and United States Army camp located in the Busanjin District.

Dongbaek Island is located at the southern end of Haeundae Beach. The island creates a picturesque scene in harmony with a thick forest of camellias and pine trees. Tourist attractions on Dongbaek Island include a walking path and the Nurimaru APEC House, built for the 2005 APEC summit.

Huinnyeoul Culture Village was created when Korean War refugees flocked to this area. It provides an unhindered view of both the Busanhang and Namhang Ports. A major backdrop of the 2013 film The Attorney, the neighborhood was also featured in the 2012 film Nameless Gangster: Rules of the Time. The small houses that stand shoulder to shoulder form the signature look of Busan, which is often remembered as a city of the sea and hilly neighborhoods. The village continues to attract an increasing number of visitors with its new cafes, workshops, and guesthouses.

Millak Waterfront Park is the first waterfront park in Korea, which combines the oceanfront with public leisure facilities. The park is located between Haeundae Beach and Gwangalli Beach. The waterfront park, with an area of 33,507m², can accommodate as many as 40,000 visitors. The floor of the park is decorated with colorful blocks, and the park provides visitors a perfect chance to relax and features flower gardens, gazebos, and benches. If you sit on the 3,040–wide stand, you can dip your feet in the water during high tide.

The estuary was chosen as a trial project for the Four Major Rivers Restoration Project. The sports facilities were partially built on the upper and lower parts of the park only, while the rest of the park underwent a restoration of its wetlands and natural grassland. In the garden inside the park, you can find a large-scale habitat for prickly water lilies, which are part of the Endangered Species Level II classification. Many interesting festivals, such as the Nakdong Riverside Cherry Blossom Festival, the Busan Nakdong River Canola Flower Festival, and the Daejeo Tomato Festival are held around this park every year.

Ilgwang Beach is a long white-sand beach, extending for about 1.8 kilometers, and is particularly popular among families with young children as a vacation spot because the waters are quite shallow. Every summer, the Gaetmaeul Outdoor Drama Festival is held on this beach. The festival features diverse performances of traditional Korean music, outdoor dramas, mime shows, and other performance art forms.

Kiswire Museum offers its visitors a chance to better understand wire, a key material for industrial development, and central to Kiswire's corporate philosophy. The museum won The 2014 Busan Architecture Award for its aesthetic design. In addition, the roof of the museum is supported by only 38 cables without any pillars or beams, which makes the museum quite unique. In addition, the museum features special art pieces, including artwork made with wires.

Jeonpo Café Street in Seomyeon, Busan is one of the busiest areas, with a variety of entertainment, restaurants, and stores. Across Seomyeon 1 Beonga (Seomyeon 1st Street), the busiest street in the area, there is a quiet and tranquil street with about 30 unique cafés. Several years ago, the Bujeon-dong and Jeonpo-dong areas were full of hardware stores and machine part suppliers. However, since 2010 the area has been transformed into a street full of cafés.

Busan is planning to build the first floating city in the world. So-called Oceanix City will be finished and ready for settlement by 2025.

Temples, religious and historical sites 

Beomeosa Temple
Busanjinjiseong Fortress (or Jaseongdae)
Cheonseongjinseong Fortress
Chungnyeolsa Shrine
Dongnaeeupseong Fortress
Dongnae Hyanggyo Confucian shrine-school
Dongnaebu Dongheon
Dongsam-dong Shell Mound
Fortress site of Jwasuyeong
Geumjeongsanseong Fortress
Haedong Yonggung Temple
Janggwancheong
Gungwancheong
Songgongdan Altar
Jeongongdan Altar
Samgwangsa Temple
Tumuli in Bokcheon-dong, Dongnae
United Nations Memorial Cemetery
Waeseong in Jukseong-ri, Gijang
Yeongdo Bridge
Yeonggadae Pavilion
Yungongdan Altar

Arts

Busan hosts the Busan International Film Festival (BIFF)—one of the most popular international film festivals in Asia—at the Busan Cinema Center every fall. It is also the home of the Busan Biennale, an international contemporary art biennale that takes place every two years.

The city also hosts the One Asia Festival, the largest K-pop festival in Korea beginning in 2016, positioning itself as the center of K-pop culture.

In 2012, German artist Hendrik Beikirch painted Asia's tallest mural entitled "Fisherman Portrait" on a building near Millak Raw Fish Town.

Busan is home to 80 performance facilities consisting of 30 public ones, including the Busan Cultural Center, Busan Citizens’Hall, Busan Cinema Center, and Busan National Gugak Center. There are 40 private facilities, such as KBS Art Hall Busan, Sohyang Art Center, MBC Samjoo Art Hall, Kyungsung University Concert Hall, and Shinsegae Department Store Culture Hall.

Festivals
Busan is the city of festivals and film. A variety of festivals are held in the city throughout the year. Following the Joseon Tongsinsa Festival (Registration of Documents on Joseon Tongsinsa on the UNESCO Memory of the World Programme in 2017) and Busan Port Festival in May, the Busan Sea Festival at Haeundae Beach, the largest beach in Korea, and the Busan International Rock Festival takes place in August. In particular, October is the perfect month to enjoy a variety of festivals, such as the Busan International Film Festival, the largest film festival in Asia, the Busan Fireworks Festival, and the One Asia Festival, a global K-pop music festival. In addition, G-Star, the largest gaming exhibition in Korea, and the e-Sports World Championship are hosted in November, followed by the Busan Christmas Tree Festival in December (Busan Fireworks Festival).

Major Public performance facilities

Museums 

Museums in Busan include:
Busan Museum
Busan Museum of Art
Museum of Contemporary Art Busan
Busan Museum of Movies
Busan Modern History Museum
Busan Marine Natural History Museum
Korea National Maritime Museum
Bokcheon Museum
Kiswire Museum
Provisional Capital Memorial Hall
Trickeye Museum
United Nations Peace Memorial Hall
40-step Stairway Culture Center
Dongnae Eupseong History Museum

Traditional cuisine 

Busan was once a center of military affairs in the southern region of the peninsula and therefore was an important site for diplomatic relationships with Japan; high-ranking officers and officials from the court frequently visited the city. Special foods were prepared for the officers such as Dongnae pajeon (동래파전), a variant of pajeon (Korean savory pancakes), made with whole scallions, sliced chili peppers, and various kinds of seafood in a thick batter of wheat flour, glutinous rice flour, eggs, salt and water.

During the Korean War, Busan was the biggest refugee destination on the peninsula; people from all regions of Korea went there. Some of these refugees stayed and adapted and adjusted the recipes of their local specialties. One of these foods is milmyeon (lit. 'wheat noodle') a version of naengmyeon, cold buckwheat noodle soup, but using wheat flour instead. (Naengmyeon is originally a specialty food of Hamhung and Pyongyang, now part of North Korea.) Dwaeji gukbap (lit. 'pork/pig soup rice') is also a result of Korean War. It is a hearty pork soup and is becoming more popular nationwide. Pork trotters served with vegetables such as cucumbers, onions, and mustard sauce is popular and is called Nangchae-Jokbal.

Hot spring resorts and spas 
Busan has the largest hot spring resorts and facilities in Korea. Busan's Oncheon is the oldest hot spring spa in Korea. It even has its unique history, where long ago an old man with aching legs was said to have seen an injured crane come to the hot spring and bath in it. After bathing in its waters, the crane became completely cured and happily flew away. Upon seeing this, the old man also bathed his aching legs in the water and was cured. Among the hot spas, ‘Dongnae Oncheon’ and ‘Haeundae Oncheon’ are the most famous ones. Today, the spas have an outdoor bath and sauna.

Spa Land (Haeundae-Gu)
HurShimChung Hot Spring Resorts and Spa Town (Dongnae-Gu)
Haeundae Hot Spring Resorts and Spa Towns (Haeundae-Gu)
Dongnae Hot Spring Resorts and Spa Towns (Dongnae-Gu)
Gwangalli Spa Towns (Suyeong-Gu)

Religion 

According to the census of 2015, 28.5% followed Buddhism and 17.5% followed Christianity (12.1% Protestantism and 5.4% Catholicism). 53.2% of the population is irreligious.

Media

Sports
The city planned to bid for the 2020 Summer Olympics, but withdrew after the 2018 Winter Olympics were awarded to Pyeongchang, also located in South Korea. The 2020 Summer Olympics were eventually awarded to Tokyo. It considered bidding to host the 2032 Summer Olympics.

Sports teams and facilities

Baseball

Since 1982, the city has been home to the Lotte Giants, who play in the Korea Professional Baseball league. In Korea, Busan is known as the capital of baseball and has a reputation for very enthusiastic baseball fans. For the first few years, the Lotte Giants utilized Gudeok Baseball Stadium as their home. In the mid-1980s, they moved to Sajik Baseball Stadium, which was built as part of a sports complex for the 1986 Asian Games.

Football
The city is home to a K League football club, the Busan IPark. The club was formerly known as the Busan Daewoo Royals and was a successful team during the 1990s. Busan is also home to a K3 League football club, the Busan Transportation Corporation.

Basketball
Until 2021, Busan was home of the Korean Basketball League team Busan KT Sonicboom, which played at the Sajik Arena.

Since 2019, Busan is the home of the Women's Korean Basketball League team Busan BNK Sum. They played at the Geumjeong Gymnasium from 2019 to 2021, and they currently play at the Sajik Arena.

2002 FIFA World Cup 

The 2002 FIFA World Cup was the world's 17th FIFA World Cup, held from 31 May to 30 June 2002 at locations in South Korea and Japan. Busan hosted matches between France and Uruguay, and ROK against Poland at the Busan Asiad Stadium.

2002 Asian Games 
The 2002 Asian Games were held in Busan from September 29 to October 14, 2002. 9,900 athletes from 44 countries competed in 38 sports. Many public sports complexes and university gymnasiums, including Busan Asiad Stadium were used for the games’ venues. The mascot was a seagull, the city bird of Busan named, "Duria". East Timor took part in the games for the first time. As well, North Korea also participated for the first time in an international event held in South Korea.

Festivals and events
Busan celebrates festivals all year round.

Medical facilities
Busan has many hospitals and clinics.
Many cosmetic surgery, dermatological, ophthalmic, and dental clinics are concentrated in Seomyeon medical street.

Hospitals in Busan include Pusan National University Hospital with 1,300 beds in Ami-dong, Kosin University Gospel Hospital with 957 beds in Amnam-dong, Dongnam Institute of Radiological & Medical Sciences specializing in cancer treatment with 298 beds, Dong-A University Hospital with 999 beds in Dongdaesin-dong, Dong-eui Medical Center with 468 beds offering cooperative western and oriental medicine treatment in Yangjeong-dong, Inje University Busan Paik Hospital with 837 beds in Gaegeum-dong, Inje University Haeundae Paik Hospital with 896 beds in Jwa-dong, Busan Medical Center with 555 beds in Sajik-dong and Busan Veterans Hospital in Jurye-dong, Sasang-gu. In particular, Seomyeon Medical Street, which first started construction in the Bujeon-dong area beginning in 1990, has formed a cluster of more than 230 medical institutions, full of expertise, that is difficult to find in other parts of the world. The "Seomyeon Medical Street Festival" has taken place annually since 2012.

Major medical centers

Transportation

Bus 
Major express bus lines link Busan with other cities in Korea at two primary bus terminals, Nopodong Bus Terminal (at the northern terminus of Subway Line 1) and Busan Seobu Bus Terminal at Sasang Station on Subway Line 2. 134 routes of urban bus service reach every part of Busan Metropolitan City.

City buses 
City buses operate a total of 160 routes. There are express buses connecting major areas quickly through tunnels and overpasses and general city buses which make stops at each bus stop. There are also airport buses connecting the Gimhae International Airport and the downtown area. Some of the city buses of Busan's adjacent cities including Yangsan, Changwon, Gimhae, and Ulsan also offer service to Busan.

Gimhae Airport Limousine Bus 
Gimhae Airport Limousine Bus is one of the fastest buses connecting Gimhae International Airport and the downtown area. As of 2012, three routes are operated by Taeyoung Airport Limousine Corp.

- Nampo-dong: Gimhae International Airport ↔ Seomyeon, Busanjin Station, Busan Station, Nampo-dong ↔ Chungmu-dong (Seo-gu Office)

- Haeundae No.1: Gimhae International Airport ↔ Namcheon-dong, BEXCO, Dongbaekseom (Westin Chosun Busan), Haeundae ↔ New City (Jangsan Station)

- Haeundae No.2: Gimhae International Airport ↔ Namcheon-dong, Gwangan Bridge, Haeundae ↔ New Town (Jangsan Station) Express Bus

Intercity buses 
Intercity buses to the east Gyeongnam, Gyeongbuk, Gangwon and Gyeonggi Provinces are available at the Busan Central Bus Terminal. Buses offering service to West Gyeongnam and Jeolla Province depart from the Busan West Bus Terminal located in Sasang. Buses to the east Gyeongnam area, including Ulsan, Gimhae, and Changwon, the Seoul Metropolitan Area, including Osan, Suwon, Ansan, Bucheon and Dong Seoul, and the southern Gangwon area, including Donghae and Gangneung, are available at the Haeundae Intercity Bus Terminal. The Dongnae Intercity Bus Terminal has buses to the central and southern Gyeongnam area, including Changwon, Gimhae, Gosung, Tongyoung, and Geoje, as well as to Suncheon, Yeosu and Gwangyang.

Sea 

Ferries leaving from the International Ferry Terminal at Busan Port Pier 3,4 connect Busan to the Japanese ports of Izuhara and Hitakatsu on Tsushima Island, as well as the cities of Shimonoseki, Fukuoka, and Osaka on Japan's mainland.
PanStar operates the PanStar Ferry between Busan and Osaka.
The Seaflower 2, the ferry to Tsushima operated by Dae-a Express Shipping, carries passengers only between Busan and Hitakatsu in 1 hour 40 minutes and between Busan and Izuhara in 2 hours 40 minutes.
The Seonghee, operated by Pukwan Ferry, links Busan to Shimonoseki.
One of the ferries to Fukuoka is the Camellia, operated by Camellia Line. The Camellia makes the trip to Fukuoka overnight in 7 hours 30 minutes, and a trip back in the afternoon in 5 hours 30 minutes.
The other ferry service to Fukuoka is assumed by the Beetles and the Kobees, 2 fleets of high-speed hydrofoils operated by Miraejet. About five departures from each city are scheduled every day. By hydrofoil, it only takes 2 hours and 55 minutes to cross the Korea Strait to Fukuoka. The Beetles owned by JR Kyushu.

National Railway 

Busan lies on a number of rail lines, of which the most important is the Gyeongbu Line which connects it to other major cities such as Seoul, Daejeon, and Daegu. All classes of trains run along the Gyeongbu Line, including the super high speed KTX trains which provide frequent services to Seoul in approximately 150 minutes. The Gyeongbu Line terminates at Busan Station. Other lines include the Donghae Nambu Line which connects Ulsan, Pohang and Gyeongju.

SRT was first launched in 2016 and runs along the Gyeongbu and Honam high-speed railways. SRT offers a new gateway connecting the Gangnam area of Seoul with major cities. It is directly connected to Subway Line 3 and the Bundang Line, enhancing accessibility to Subway Lines 2, 5, and 8, as well as the Shinbundang Line, and it is also located near the Dongbu Expressway which connects to other major highways.

Metro 

There are six subway lines as of January 2017. The transit stations are as follows: Seomyeon Station (Line 1, 2) / Yeonsan Station (Line 1, 3) / Suyeong Station (Lines 2, 3) / Deokcheon Station (Lines 2, 3) / Minam Station (Lines 3, 4) / Dongnae Station (Lines 1, 4) / Sasang Station (Line 2, Busan - Gimhae Light Rail Transit) / Daejeo Station (Line 3, Busan - Gimhae Light Rail Transit) / Busan National University of Education Station (Line 1, Donghae Line) / Bexco Station (Line 2, Donghae Line) / Geoje Station (Line 3, Donghae Line).

Air 
Busan is served by Gimhae International Airport in Gangseo-gu. Gimhae International Airport is connected by Busan-Gimhae Light Rail Transit.

International relations

Twin towns – sister cities

Busan shares the title of sister city with several coastal cities or provinces around the world.

 Kaohsiung, Taiwan (1966)
 Los Angeles, USA (1967)
 Shimonoseki, Japan (1976)
 Barcelona, Spain (1983)
 Rio de Janeiro, Brazil (1985)
 Vladivostok, Russia (1992)
 Shanghai, China (1993)
 Surabaya, Indonesia (1994)
 State of Victoria, Australia (1994)
 Ho Chi Minh City, Vietnam (1995)
 Tijuana, Mexico (1995)
 Auckland, New Zealand (1996)
 Valparaíso, Chile (1999)
 Montreal, Canada (2000)
 Western Cape, South Africa (2000)
 Istanbul, Turkey (2002)
 Dubai, UAE (2006)
 Fukuoka, Japan (2007)
 Chicago, USA (2007)
 Saint Petersburg, Russia (2008)
 Phnom Penh, Cambodia (2009)
 Mumbai, India (2009)
 Thessaloniki, Greece (2010)
 Casablanca, Morocco (2011)
 Cebu Province, Philippines (2011)
 Yangon, Myanmar (2013)
 Gdynia, Poland (2020)

Friendship cities
Busan has 11 friendship cities in six countries.

 Shenzhen, China (2007)
 Tianjin, China (2007)
 Osaka, Japan (2008)
 Chongqing, China (2010)
 Bangkok, Thailand (2011)
 Beijing, China (2013)
 Nagasaki, Japan (2014)
 Bandar Abbas, Iran (2016)
 Ulaanbaatar, Mongolia (2016)
 Panama City, Panama (2016)
 Guangzhou, China (2019)

Sister ports
The Port of Busan also has 6 sister ports (listed in order of dates).

 – Port of Southampton, UK (1978)
 – Port of Miami, USA (1981)
 – Port of Osaka, Japan (1985)
 – Port of Rotterdam, Netherlands (1985)
 – Port of New York & New Jersey, USA (1988)
 – Port of Shanghai, China (1994)

Notable people
  

Cho Won-woo (born 1994), windsurfer
Choi Jin-ri / Sulli (born 1994, died 2019), singer, actress, and former member of F(x)
Choi Min-gi / Ren (born 1995), singer, songwriter, actor, and former member of NU'EST
Gong Yoo (born in 1979), award-winning actor
Hwang Min-hyun (born 1995), singer, songwriter, actor, and former member of NU'EST
Jeon Jungkook (born 1997), singer, producer, songwriter, and member of BTS
Jung Eun-ji (born 1993), singer, songwriter, actress, and member of Apink
Jo Yuri (born 2001), singer, actress, and former member of Iz*One
Kang Daniel (born in 1996), singer, a former member of Wanna One
Kim Hee-jin (born in 1991), South Korea women's national volleyball team
Lee Jang-kun (born 1992), professional Kabaddi player
Lee Jihoon / Woozi (born 1996), singer, dancer, producer, songwriter, and member of Seventeen
Park Jihoon (born 2000), leader, vocalist, dancer, member of Treasure
Park Jimin (born 1995), singer, songwriter, dancer, and member of BTS
Sandara Park (born 1984), singer, actress, and former member of 2NE1
Park Woo-jin (born 1999), rapper, singer, dancer, songwriter, a former member of Wanna One, member of AB6IX
Yang Hyo-jin (born in 1989), a former member of the South Korean women's national volleyball team
Yang Jeong-in / I.N (born 2001), vocalist, member of Stray Kids
 Yoo Kang-min (born 2003), singer, member of VERIVERY

See also
40–step stairway
Busan–Geoje Fixed Link
Centum City, urban complex
Gwangan Bridge
List of cities in South Korea
List of East Asian ports
Pusan Newport International Terminal

Notes

References

Citations

Bibliography
.
.

External links

 
All About Busan – The Official Korea Tourism Guide Site

 
Populated coastal places in South Korea
Port cities and towns in South Korea
Special Cities and Metropolitan Cities of South Korea